Qingshuipu Station is an elevated metro station in Ningbo, Zhejiang, China. Qingshuipu Station is a station of Line 2, Ningbo Rail Transit. It situates on Ningzhen Road. Construction of the station starts in middle 2012 and opened to service in September 26, 2015.

Exits 

Qingshuipu Station has 2 exits.

References 

Railway stations in Zhejiang
Railway stations in China opened in 2015
Ningbo Rail Transit stations